"Mirror" is a song by Porter Robinson, an American musician and music producer. It was released on August 26, 2020, as the third single from his second studio album Nurture. The song was produced by Robinson and features electronically processed vocals written and performed by himself. Robinson has stated that this song was written to explore his struggles with depression around 2015 and 2016.

The release was accompanied by the opening of an interactive virtual environment on Robinson's website nurtu.re. A music video for "Mirror" was released on September 9, 2020, featuring an animated avatar of Robinson as the camera walks through the forest.

Background and composition 
Following the release of Worlds and its subsequent live tour, Robinson found himself stuck in an extended period of writer's block and insecurity about the quality of his work, which led to him falling into depression between 2015 and 2016. During this time, he released only two songs, "Shelter" and his remix of Nero's "The Thrill." However, he notably began work on the second single from Nurture, "Something Comforting." According to Robinson, "Mirror" was written to represent his issues with his mental state and artistic pride.

Like the other songs from Nurture, this song features a version of Robinson's voice that has been electronically processed to sound more feminine by increasing the pitch and adding additional effects. The song is set in E♭ major at 112 BPM.

This was also the song that appeared in the teaser video for Nurture in January of 2020, ahead of the release of its leading single "Get Your Wish."

Music video 
The music video for "Mirror" was premiered on YouTube on September 9, 2020. Robinson preceded the live premiere of the music video with a short livestream where he answered questions from his viewers and performed a few songs on his piano. The music video was directed by Robinson, and prominently features an animated avatar of him illustrated by Hota. The video shows the camera moving through the woods along a trail, with the animated avatar singing the lyrics and several additional visual effects synchronized with the music appearing throughout the frame.

Personnel 
Credits adapted from Tidal.

 Porter Robinson - producer, composer, lyricist, mixer
 Randy Merril - engineer
 Tom Norris - mixer

Charts

References

External links
 

2020 singles
2020 songs
Porter Robinson songs
Song recordings produced by Porter Robinson
Songs written by Porter Robinson
Mom + Pop Music singles